Boris Becker and Jakob Hlasek were the defending champions, but Hlasek did not participate this year.  Becker partnered Guy Forget, and they won the title, defeating Jim Grabb and Patrick McEnroe 4–6, 6–4, 6–3 in the final.

Seeds
The top four seeded teams received byes into the second round.

Draw

Finals

Top half

Bottom half

External links
 1990 Newsweek Champions Cup Doubles Draw

Newsweek Champions Cup Doubles